The Mayan sea catfish (Ariopsis assimilis), also known as the Mayan catfish or the Maya sea catfish, is a species of sea catfish in the family Ariidae. It was described by Albert Günther in 1864, originally under the genus Arius. It is found in tropical brackish and freshwater bodies in Belize, Costa Rica, Guatemala, Honduras, Mexico, Nicaragua, and Panama.

The Mayan sea catfish is of minor commercial interest to fisheries, and its meat is generally consumed fresh.

References

Ariidae
Catfish, Mayan
Fish of El Salvador
Fish of Guatemala
Fish of Honduras
Fish of Nicaragua
Catfish, Mayan
Fauna of the Yucatán Peninsula
Fish described in 1864
Taxa named by Albert Günther